East Metro Mall is a shopping center located in Da'an District, Taipei, Taiwan. It is the first underground mall in the Eastern District of Taipei, connecting Zhongxiao Dunhua metro station and Zhongxiao Fuxing metro station.

History
 East Metro Mall officially started operation on July 19th, 2002.

Structure
The East Metro Mall is located under Zhongxiao East Road, starting from the east of Zhongxiao Fuxing metro station in the west, and reaching the east of Zhongxiao Dunhua metro station in the east. The floor area on the west of the mall is equal to the subterranean floor of Zhongxiao Fuxing metro station, and the floor area on the east is slightly higher than the underground of Zhongxiao Dunhua metro station. There are 17 entrances and exits in the underground mall, among which exits 1-8 are the entrances and exits of Zhongxiao Dunhua metro station; the west side is connected with Zhongxiao Fuxing metro station by a long corridor.

Gallery

See also
 Zhongshan Metro Mall
 Taipei City Mall
 Station Front Metro Mall
 List of shopping malls in Taipei

References

External links

Official website
Travel Taipei

2002 establishments in Taiwan
Semi-subterranean structures
Shopping malls in Taipei
Shopping malls established in 2002
Underground cities in Taipei